The 2008 Brisbane Broncos season was the 21st in the club's history. They competed in the NRL's 2008 Telstra Premiership, the centenary season of rugby league football in Australia. The Broncos finished the regular season 5th (out of 16) but were knocked out of the finals by eventual grand finalists Melbourne Storm for the second consecutive year.

Season summary
The Broncos started the season winning their first three games. 48–12 against the Penrith Panthers in round 1, 20–14 against the Sydney Roosters in round 2 and 36-2 against the North Queensland Cowboys in round 3. Round 3 gave way to an attendance of 50,612 people, biggest crowd at Suncorp Stadium. The Broncos suffered their first loss of the 2008 season with a 28–8 loss to reigning premiers the Melbourne Storm in round 4.

Round 5 saw the Broncos have a 34–22 win over the Newcastle Knights at Energy Australia Stadium. Justin Hodges starred with a two try effort with Michael Ennis also scoring two tries, while always looking dangerous. Round 6 was a disappointing 26–24 loss for the Broncos to the red hot Gold Coast Titans. The Titans burst out of the blocks with a 16–0 lead after 20 mins. However the Broncos fought back strongly, with a missed goal from the sideline from Michael Ennis late in the second half the difference. In round 9, the Broncos lost their first match of the season while leading at halftime when they led 12–6 at halftime to lose 30–12 against the Manly Sea Eagles, it was also Broncos first loss for the season at Suncorp Stadium. In round 10, the Broncos lost their first back-to-back losses for the season when they lost to the Cronulla-Sutherland Sharks 13-6 at Toyota Park. The Broncos returned to the winners list with a very thrilling 30–26 win against the Parramatta Eels at Suncorp Stadium in round 12. Also Denan Kemp equalled the record for the most tries in a match for the Broncos with 4 tries against the Eels in round 12. Karmichael Hunt kicked his first ever field goal when he won the game for the Broncos 19-18 against the Wests Tigers in round 15. Also Nick Kenny scored his first ever try in first grade against the Tigers. The Broncos played out their first draw since round 25, 2004 and the first draw of the season with a hard fought 12–12 draw with the Penrith Panthers at CUA Stadium in round 16. In round 20, the Broncos won their first back to back wins since round 8 with a hard fort 18–12 win over the Cronulla Sharks at Suncorp Stadium. Joel Clinton has scored his first try for the Broncos in the Broncos 25–21 win over the Gold Coast Titans at Suncorp Stadium in round 24. In round 25, the Broncos secured another finals campaign with a 36–22 win over the Canterbury Bulldogs at Suncorp Stadium. The Broncos will compete in their 17th straight finals series. The Broncos took on the Sydney Roosters in the Qualifying Final and the Broncos turned an 8-point halftime deficit into an 8-point win coming from 16–8 down to win 24–16 at the SFS. The Broncos season came to an end when Greg Inglis crossed the line with 1 minute to play as the Broncos led the Melbourne Storm 14-12 in the semi-final at Suncorp Stadium. They lost 16–14.

After the NRL season, Brisbane's Darius Boyd was selected to make his international debut for Australia in the 2008 Rugby League World Cup.

Results

Ladder

Scorers

Honours

League
Nil

Club
Player of the year: Sam Thaiday
Rookie of the year: Denan Kemp
Back of the year: Karmichael Hunt
Forward of the year: Sam Thaiday
Club man of the year: Matt Middleton

Casualties

Suspended
Justin Hodges

Squad
Bold Players have played International or State any year

Full Backs
Australian  Karmichael Hunt
Australian Rodney Davies
Australian Denan Kemp
Australian Josh Hoffman
Wingers
Australian Darius Boyd
Australian Reece Robinson
Australian Steve Michaels
Australian Craig Frawley
Australian Tom Hewitt
Australian Kaine Manihera 
Centres
Australian Justin Hodges
Australian Nick Emmett 
Australian Joel Moon
Halves
Australian Darren Lockyer (c)
Scotland Peter Wallace
Australian Shane Perry
Hookers
Australian Michael Ennis
Australian Michael Roberts
Australian PJ Marsh
Australian Andrew McCullough

Props
Australian Ben Hannant
Australian Nick Kenny
Australian Sam Thaiday
Australian Dave Taylor
Australian Joel Clinton
Second Rowers
Australian David Stagg
Australian Corey Parker
Fiji Ashton Sims
Australian Derrick Watkins
Locks
Australian  Tonie Carroll
New Zealander Greg Eastwood

Player movements

Toyota Cup results

QF Sydney Roosters vs Brisbane Broncos venue SFS

SF Melbourne Storm vs Brisbane Broncos venue Suncorp Stadium

See also
NRL season 2008
History of the Brisbane Broncos

Footnotes

External links
Brisbane Broncos official site

Brisbane Broncos seasons
Brisbane Broncos season